The 2018 E3 Harelbeke was a road cycling one-day race that took place on 23 March 2018 in Belgium. It was the 61st edition of the E3 Harelbeke and the tenth event of the 2018 UCI World Tour. The race was won by Niki Terpstra, who stayed 20 seconds clear of an elite group, led home by his teammate Philippe Gilbert, with 's Greg Van Avermaet completing the podium.

Teams
As E3 Harelbeke was a UCI World Tour event, all eighteen UCI WorldTeams were invited automatically and obliged to enter a team in the race. Seven UCI Professional Continental teams competed, completing the 25-team peloton.

Results

References

External links

2018 UCI World Tour
2018 in Belgian sport
2018
March 2018 sports events in Belgium